Priscos is a Portuguese parish, located in the municipality of Braga. The population in 2011 was 1,341, in an area of 3.65 km2.

References

Freguesias of Braga